The Needle Rocks, also known as the Needles, are a group of five main rock islets located close to the south-western coast of Tasmania, Australia.

The Maatsuyker Island Lighthouse is located on Maatsuyker Island and illuminates the Needle Rocks.

Fauna

The vegetation is dominated by the pig face, a succulent plant.

The islets are part of the Maatsuyker Island Group Important Bird Area, identified as such by BirdLife International because of its importance as a breeding site for seabirds. Recorded breeding seabird and wader species are the little penguin (40 pairs), short-tailed shearwater (860 pairs), fairy prion (10,600 pairs), Pacific gull, silver gull, sooty oystercatcher and black-faced cormorant.  The metallic skink is present.  Up to 1200 Australian fur seals use the rocks as a regular haul-out site.

See also

 South East Cape
 South West Cape
 List of islands of Tasmania

References

Islands of South West Tasmania
Protected areas of Tasmania
Important Bird Areas of Tasmania